Isaac Smith Kalloch (July 10, 1832 – December 9, 1887) was a Baptist pastor from New England who served as the 18th Mayor of San Francisco serving from December 1, 1879, to December 4, 1881. He also served as the first president of Ottawa University in Kansas from 1866 to 1868.

Early life in New England and move West
He was born at Rockland, Maine and attended Colby College (Waterville College) until he was expelled in 1849 (later receiving an honorary M.A. in 1856). In the 1850s Kalloch served as a Baptist minister in Rockland, Maine and then Boston, Massachusetts at Tremont Temple from 1855 to 1860, where he was acquitted of accusations of adultery in 1857. Kalloch eventually went to New York where he served as a pastor from 1861 to 1864. He then moved to Kansas, living there from 1864 to 1875 where he was a co-founder and the first president of Ottawa University from 1866 to 1868.  In 1875 he went to California looking to spread the Baptist faith.

Mayorship of San Francisco and Assassination Attempt
In 1878, Kalloch became one of the major religious leaders of San Francisco to endorse the  Workingmen's Party of California. This endorsement brought himself increased fame as "workingmen flocked to his church" and his "halls were packed as never before." Because of his popular role in the San Francisco community, in 1879, the Workingmen's Party of California helped him run for Mayor of San Francisco. Kalloch's involvement in the Workingmen's Party of California has been attributed to the party looking to fulfill both the party's and its membership's spiritual needs.

During Isaac Kalloch's campaign for mayor, he came under attack from the San Francisco Chronicle's editor-in-chief, Charles de Young, who was backing another candidate. DeYoung, with the hopes of taking Kalloch out of the mayoral race, accused the minister of having an affair. Kalloch responded by accusing Charles' mother, Amelia, of running a brothel. In response, Charles DeYoung ambushed Kalloch in the streets of San Francisco and shot him twice. Kalloch survived the wounds and with the sympathy of voters was elected the 18th Mayor of San Francisco. He served from 1879 until 1881. On April 23, 1880, Kalloch's son, Isaac Milton Kalloch, entered the Chronicle building and shot and killed Charles DeYoung. After his time in office, Kalloch left San Francisco and moved to the Washington Territory. He died of diabetes in Bellingham, Washington, aged 55.

References

1832 births
1887 deaths
American shooting survivors
Colby College alumni
Deaths from diabetes
Mayors of San Francisco
People from Rockland, Maine
Politicians from Bellingham, Washington
19th-century American politicians